The Empress is a 2022 German historical drama series based on the life of Empress Elisabeth of Austria, starring Devrim Lingnau in the title role, and Philip Froissant as Emperor Franz Joseph. It was released on Netflix on 29 September 2022. It was Netflix's second-most watched series worldwide for two weeks and the seventh most popular non-English series of 2022, with over 150 million hours streamed. On 8 November 2022, Netflix renewed it for a second season. Netflix also commissioned a companion novel, The Empress: A Novel, by Gigi Griffis, which published two days before the series premiered on the streaming service.

Premise
Sixteen-year-old Bavarian duchess Elisabeth "Sisi" falls in love with her sister's intended fiancé Emperor Franz Joseph and they marry. She moves to Vienna and finds herself navigating the complexity of court politics and her husband's scheming family. Her mother-in-law Sophia, who is also her aunt, antagonizes her almost immediately. Maximilian, Franz Joseph's younger brother, tries to outshine his older brother and prove that he is more worthy to rule.

Cast
 Devrim Lingnau as Elisabeth von Wittelsbach
 Philip Froissant as Franz Joseph I of Austria 
 Melika Foroutan as Princess Sophie, Archduchess of Austria, mother of Emperor Franz Joseph
 Johannes Nussbaum as Archduke Maximilian, brother of Emperor Franz Joseph
 Elisa Schlott as Duchess Helene in Bavaria, Elisabeth's older sister
 Jördis Triebel as Ludovika, Duchess in Bavaria, mother of Helene and Elisabeth
 Almila Bagriacik as Countess Leontine von Apafi, a revolutionary posing as a countess
 Hanna Hilsdorf as Countess Amalia von Salm-Reifferscheidt, a countess who's dedicated her own life to the Austrian empire
 Runa Greiner as Countess Charlotte von Stubenberg, a naive countess
 Svenja Jung as Countess Louise Gundemann, Franz Joseph's old lover
 Andreas Döhler as Duke Maximilian Joseph in Bavaria, father of Helene and Elisabeth
 Wiebke Puls as Countess Sophie Esterházy, matron of the empress's maid service
 Michael Fuith as Archduke Franz Karl of Austria, Sophie's husband
 Felix Nölle as Archduke Ludwig Viktor of Austria, the youngest brother of Franz and Maximilian
 Martin Butzke as Gustav, Prince of Vasa, Sophie's lover and Franz Joseph's biological father
 Alexander Finkenwirth as Baron Alexander von Bach, interior minister; a progressive advisor of Franz Joseph's.
 Leopold Hornung as Count Karl Ferdinand von Buol, foreign minister; a militaristic advisor.
 Patrick Rapold as Franz Liszt
 August Schmölzer as Prince-Archbishop Joseph Othmar von Rauscher
 Raymond Tarabay as François-Adolphe De Bourqueney, french ambassador
 Eric Bouwer as Doctor Fritsch, a maternity doctor
 Irene Della Casa as Baronesse Francesca, Maximilian's girlfriend at the start of the series
 Rauand Taleb as Theo, Franz Joseph's butler
 Erol Nowak as Johann Baron Kempen von Fichtenstamm, Inspector General of the police
 Merlin Rose as Egon, a revolutionary
 Noemi Emily Krausz as Margarete
 Anna Bottcher as Elsa, a housemaid and revolutionary
 Markus Fennert as Lieutenant Krall
 Andreas Bongard as Johann Strauss
 Vladimir Korneev as Grand Duke Alexander Nikolayevich, son of Tsar Nicholas I
 Elzemarieke De Vos as Grand Duchess Maria Alexandrovna, Alexander's wife

Episodes

Production

Development
In December 2020, Netflix announced it would start producing a six-part series with the working title The Empress, based on the life of Austrian Empress Elisabeth of Bavaria (nicknamed Sisi). It would be directed by Katrin Gebbe and Florian Cossen, with Bernd Lange and Jana Nandzik writing. Devrim Lingnau and Philip Froissant were announced in the lead roles.

Filming
Filming began in August 2021 and was completed in January 2022. The series was filmed in German. Netflix subsequently dubbed the series into 14 languages, including English. Subtitles were provided in 32 languages.

The story line takes place primarily in Vienna, though parts of the first episode are set in Bavaria, where the young Elisabeth was living when she met the emperor. Nonetheless, exterior filming was completed in Germany, primarily in Bavaria. For studio work, the production moved to Babelsberg Studio in Potsdam. Location shooting was completed in cities such as Bayreuth, Stein, Bamberg, Dinkelsbühl, Eckersdorf and Aidhausen. Several historical locations were used, including Schloss Weißenstein in Pommersfelden, which stood in for Schönbrunn Palace. Exterior scenes of Sisi's childhood home were filmed at Eyrichshof Castle near Ebern, although the family's summer home was actually the nearby Possenhofen Castle.

Season 2
In November 2022, Netflix renewed the series for a second season.

Reception
The Empress debuted at number one following its release on 29 September 2022, with 47.2 million hours watched in four days (29 September to 2 October 2022), becoming Netflix's most-watched non-English language series for over a week. Within 11 days, it was running in approximately 18.7 million homes and was the second most-watched Netflix series worldwide (behind Dahmer – Monster: The Jeffrey Dahmer Story), with 106.6 million hours streamed. It was in the top ten in 79 countries in its first week, and in 88 countries in its second week. Within 18 days, it was streamed for nearly 135 million hours in around 23.6 million homes worldwide.

The Empress is the most successful German original production on Netflix since the 2020 war drama Barbarians. The series had 59.43 million hours watched worldwide from October 3–9, 2022, and it was the seventh most popular non-English series of 2022, with 5 weeks in the global top 10 and 159,800,000 hours watched from September 25 to October 30.

Soundtrack

Historical inaccuracies
 Elisabeth (Sisi) had brown eyes 
 Elisabeth was more fair-haired than her sister Helene when she was younger, which was a significant factor in Franz Joseph's attraction towards her. 
 Elisabeth and Franz Joseph's first meeting at Bad Ischl wasn't outdoors, but during tea with more relatives present than shown.
 Sisi and Franz are shown mutually falling in love. In reality, Franz was more in love with Sisi than she was with him. Sisi was equally shocked at Franz's proposal.
 Franz didn't propose publicly, but had Archduchess Sophie request Ludovika's permission. 
 Franz Joseph's second younger brother, Karl Ludwig, was in love with Elisabeth and wanted to marry her, not Maximilian as shown. During childhood, Karl Ludwig and Elisabeth exchanged letters and gifts.
 Sophie was reluctant over Franz and Elisabeth's marriage and often fought with the Empress over the upbringing of her (Elisabeth’s) children. However, there is no evidence to support she actually hated Sisi. In reality, Sophie's letters and diaries positively describe her daughter in law. 
 Archduchess Sophie was in love with Napoleon II (her husband’s nephew) when she was younger, not Swedish Prince Gustav as shown. Maximilian was allegedly the result of said relationship, not Franz Joseph, although these rumors were deemed dubious.
 Franz Joseph and Maximilian had a sour relationship as adults, but there is no evidence that the latter conspired to overthrow his brother as Emperor.
 In the waltz scene featuring composer Johann Strauss II, Franz Joseph and Sisi dance to the 'Emperor Waltz'. This waltz was composed by Strauss in 1889, 35 years after the royal couple married.

References

External links

German-language Netflix original programming
2020s German drama television series
2022 German television series debuts
Cultural depictions of Empress Elisabeth of Austria
Cultural depictions of Franz Joseph I of Austria
Cultural depictions of Maximilian I of Mexico
Television series set in the 19th century
Television series based on actual events
Television shows set in Bavaria
Television shows set in Vienna
Television series set in the 1850s